Michael Wayne Gates, known as Mickey Gates (born 1959/1960), is a businessman from Hot Springs, Arkansas, who was a Republican member of the Arkansas House of Representatives for District 22.

Born in Perryton, Texas, Gates grew up in Spearman, but moved to Borger to finish the last three years of his public education at Borger High School.

Arrest
In June 2018, Gates was arrested and charged with six counts of failure to pay or file a tax return between 2012 through 2017. Though he had not filed tax returns since 2003, the statute of limitations was six years. Authorities with the Arkansas Department of Finance and Administration say he owes upwards of $260,000 including penalties. He was removed from the office by a super-majority vote on October 11, 2019.

References

Living people
American people convicted of tax crimes
Arkansas politicians convicted of crimes
People expelled from United States state legislatures
People from Perryton, Texas
People from Hansford County, Texas
People from Borger, Texas
Politicians from Hot Springs, Arkansas
Businesspeople from Arkansas
Republican Party members of the Arkansas House of Representatives
County officials in Arkansas
American anti-abortion activists
21st-century American politicians
Year of birth uncertain
Year of birth missing (living people)